The Democratic Alliance Party is the name of (al least) two parties

Democratic Alliance Party (Albania)
Democratic Alliance Party (Haiti)
Democratic Alliance Party (Solomon Islands)
Democratic Alliance Party (Tunisia)
Democratic Party (Cook Islands), previously known as "Democratic Alliance Party"